The following is a list of books by Debbie Macomber, an American author of romance novels and contemporary women's fiction.

Fiction

Legendary Lovers Series
 Cindy and the Prince, Silhouette Books 1988
 Some Kind of Wonderful, Silhouette Books 1988
 Almost Paradise, Silhouette Books 1988
 Legendary Lovers, Silhouette Books 1995 (Reissue of Cindy and the Prince, Some Kind of Wonderful & Almost Paradise)

Navy Series
 Navy Wife, Silhouette Books 1988/2003
 Navy Blues, Silhouette Books 1989/2003
 Navy Brat, Silhouette Books 1991/2004
 Navy Woman, Silhouette Books 1991/2004
 Navy Baby, HQN Books 1991/2005
 Navy Husband, Silhouette Special Edition 2005
 Navy Brides (2005) (Omnibus: Navy Wife / Navy Blues / Navy Brat)
 Navy Grooms (2005) (Omnibus: Navy Woman / Navy Baby / Navy Husband)
 Navy Wife / Navy Blues (omnibus) (2006)

The Manning Sisters Series
 The Cowboy’s Lady, Silhouette Special Edition 1990
 The Sheriff Takes A Wife, Silhouette Special Edition 1990

The Wyoming Series
 Denim and Diamonds, (1989)
 The Wyoming Kid,  (2006)

Those Manning Men Series
 Marriage of Inconvenience, Silhouette Special Edition 1992
 Stand-In Wife, Silhouette Special Edition 1992
 Bride on the Loose, Silhouette Special Edition 1992
 Same Time, Next Year, (1995)
 Silver Bells,  (2009)

Orchard Valley Trilogy
 Valerie, Harlequin 1992
 Stephanie, Harlequin 1992
 Norah, Harlequin 1993
 Lone Star Lovin, Harlequin 1993
 Orchard Valley, MIRA Books 1999 (Reissue of Valerie, Stephanie, & Norah)

From This Day Forward
 Groom Wanted, Silhouette Special Edition 1993
 Bride Wanted, Silhouette Special Edition 1993
 Marriage Wanted, Silhouette Special Edition 1993

Angel Series
 A Season of Angels , Harper/Avon 1993
 The Trouble With Angels, Harper/Avon 1994
 Touched By Angels, Harper/Avon 1995
 Shirley, Goodness and Mercy, MIRA Books 1999
 Those Christmas Angels, Harlequin SuperRomance 2003
 Where Angels Go, Mira Books, 2007
 Angels at the Table, Ballantine, 2012
 Christmas Angels, Harper/Avon 1996/1998 (Reissue of Touched by Angels, The Trouble With Angels & A Season of Angels)
 A Gift to Last, MIRA Books 2002 (Reissue of Can This Be Christmas? & Shirley, Goodness, and Mercy)
 Angels Everywhere, Harper/Avon 2002 (Reissue of A Season of Angels & Touched By Angels)
 Angels At Christmas, MIRA Books 2009 (Reissue of Those Christmas Angels & Where Angels Go)

Mrs. Miracle and Mr. Miracle Series
 Mrs. Miracle (2009)
 Call Me Mrs. Miracle (2010)
 Mr. Miracle (2014)
 A Mrs. Miracle Christmas (2019)

That Special Woman Series Multi-Author
 Hasty Wedding (1993)
 Baby Blessed (1994)
 Same Time, Next Year (1995)

Midnight Sons Series
 Brides For Brothers, Harlequin Romance 1995
 The Marriage Risk, Harlequin Romance 1995
 Daddy's Little Helper, Harlequin Romance 1995
 Because of the Baby, Harlequin Romance 1996
 Falling For Him, Harlequin Romance 1996
 Ending In Marriage, Harlequin Romance 1996
 Mail Order Marriages, Harlequin Romance 2000
 Family Men, Harlequin Romance 2000
 The Last Two Bachelors, Harlequin Romance 2000
 Born In A Small Town, Harlequin SuperRomance 2000
 Family Men (2000) (Omnibus: Daddy's Little Helper / Because of the Baby)
 The Last Two Bachelors (2000) (Omnibus: Falling for Him / Ending in Marriage)
 Mail-Order Marriages (2000) (Omnibus: Brides for Brothers / Marriage Risk)

Deliverance Company Series
 Someday Soon, Harper/Avon 1995
 Sooner or Later, Harper/Avon 1996
 The Sooner The Better, (1998)
 Moon Over Water / The Sooner the Better, MIRA Books 1999/2003

Heart of Texas Series
 Lonesome Cowboy, Harlequin Romance 1998
 Texas Two-Step, Harlequin Romance 1998
 Caroline's Child, Harlequin Romance 1998
 Dr. Texas, Harlequin Romance 1998
 Nell's Cowboy, Harlequin Romance 1998
 Lone Star Baby, Harlequin Romance 1998
 Promise, Texas, MIRA Books 1999
 Return to Promise, MIRA Books 2000
  Heart of Texas Vol. 1: Lonesome Cowboy/Texas Two-Step (2007)
  Heart of Texas Vol. 2: Caroline's Child / Dr. Texas (2007)
  Heart of Texas Vol. 3: Nell's Cowboy/ Lone Star Baby (2008)

Dakota Series
 Dakota Born, MIRA Books 2000
 Dakota Home, MIRA Books 2000
 Always Dakota, MIRA Books 2001
 Buffalo Valley, MIRA Books 2001
 Dakota Farm, MIRA Books 2013

Cedar Cove
These series take place in the fictional community of Cedar Cove'''.

Cedar Cove Series

 16 Lighthouse Road, MIRA Books 2001
 204 Rosewood Lane, MIRA Books 2002
 311 Pelican Court, MIRA Books 2003
 44 Cranberry Point, MIRA Books 2004
 50 Harbor Street, MIRA Books 2005
 6 Rainier Drive, MIRA Books 2006
 74 Seaside Avenue, MIRA Books 2007
 8 Sandpiper Way, MIRA Books 2008
 92 Pacific Boulevard (MIRA Books, September 2009)
 1022 Evergreen Place Fall 2010
 1105 Yakima Street MIRA Books 2011
 1225 Christmas Tree Lane MIRA Books 2011
 A Cedar Cove Christmas MIRA Books October 2008
 Christmas in Cedar Cove MIRA Books 2010  (Omnibus:  5-B Poppy Lane, 2006 and A Cedar Cove Christmas, 2008)
 A Merry Little Christmas MIRA Books (2012)

Rose Harbor Series
 This series takes place in Cedar Cove with a new cast of characters but with returning favorites from the original series.

 When First They Met, 2012 (e-book and included in the mass-market paperback version of The Inn At Rose Harbor)
 The Inn At Rose Harbor, 2012 (em Português: A Pousada Rose Harbor)
 Lost and Found in Cedar Cove, 2013 (e-book)
 Rose Harbor in Bloom, 2013
 Love Letters, 2014
 Falling for Her, 2015 (e-book)
 Silver Linings, 2015
 Sweet Tomorrows, August 2, 2016

The Blossom Street Series
 The Shop on Blossom Street, MIRA Books 2004/2005
 A Good Yarn, MIRA Books 2005/2006
 Susannah's Garden, MIRA Books May 2006
 Christmas Letters, Mira Books October 2006
 Back on Blossom Street, MIRA Books 2007
 Twenty Wishes, MIRA Books 2008
 Summer on Blossom Street, May 2009
 Hannah's List, April 2010
 A Turn in the Road, April 2011
 Starting Now, April 2013
 Blossom Street Brides, March 2014

New Beginnings
 Last One Home, Ballantine Books (March 2015)
 A Girl's Guide to Moving On, Ballantine Books (February 2016)
 If Not For You, Ballantine Books (February 2017)

Stand-alone novels
 Starlight (1983)
 Girl Like Janet (1984)
 Undercover Dreamer (1984)
 Heartsong (1984)
 That Wintry Feeling (1984)
 Thanksgiving Prayer (1984)
 Gift of Christmas (1984)
 Borrowed Dreams: Alaska (1985)
 Love Thy Neighbor (1985)
 Adam's Image (1985)
 Promise Me Forever (1985)
 Laughter in the Rain (1985)
 The Trouble with Caasi (1985)
 A Friend or Two (1985)
 Christmas Masquerade (1985)
 Let It Snow (1986)
 The Matchmakers (1986)
 Reflections of Yesterday (1986)
 Shadow Chasing (1986)
 Yesterday's Hero (1986)
 White Lace and Promises (1986)
 Jury of His Peers (1986)
 Yesterday Once More (1986)
 Friends and Then Some (1986)
 All Things Considered (1987)
 Love by Degree (1987)
 Sugar and Spice (1987)
 Mail-Order Bride (1987)
 No Competition (1987)
 Love 'N' Marriage (1987)
 Husband Required (1987)
 Any Sunday (1988)
 The Playboy and the Widow (1988)
 Denim and Diamonds (1989)
 Yours and Mine (1989)
 Almost an Angel (1989)
 For All My Tomorrows (1989)
 The Way to a Man's Heart (1989)
 Country Bride (1990)
 Fallen Angel (1990)
 A Little Bit Country (1990)
 Rainy Day Kisses (1990)
 The Courtship of Carol Sommars (1990)
 First Comes Marriage (1991)
 My Funny Valentine (1991)
 Here Comes Trouble (1991)
 Stolen Kisses (1991)
 Father's Day (1991)
 The Forgetful Bride (1991)
 The Man You'll Marry (1992)
 My Hero (1992)
 Lone Star Lovin' (1993)
 Ready for Romance (1993)
 Morning Comes Softly, Harper (1993/2006)
 One Night, Harper (1994)
 Family Affair (1994)
 This Matter of Marriage, MIRA Books (1997/2003)
 Three Brides, No Groom ,Silhouette Books (1997)
 Montana MIRA Books, (1998)
 Can This Be Christmas?, MIRA Books (1998)
 Thursdays at Eight, MIRA Books (2001)
 Between Friends, MIRA Books (2002)
 The Christmas Basket, MIRA Books (2002)
 Changing Habits, MIRA Books (2003)
 The Snow Bride , MIRA Books (2003)
 When Christmas Comes, (Christmas gift edition hardcover) MIRA Books November (2004)
 There's Something About Christmas, MIRA Books November (2005)
 The Perfect Christmas, MIRA Books October (2009)
 Starry Night, Ballantine Books (2013)
 Mr. Miracle, Ballantine Books (2014)
 Twelve Days of Christmas, Ballantine Books (2016)
 Merry and Bright, Ballantine Books (2017)
 Cottage By the Sea, Ballantine Books (July 17, 2018)
 Alaskan Holiday, Ballantine Books (October 2, 2018)

Anthologies
 Christmas Treasures '86, Silhouette 1986
 Christmas Treasures '91 Silhouette 1991
 To Mother With Love, Silhouette 1993
 Men in Uniform By Request, 1994
 Three Mothers and a Cradle, Silhouette 1995
 Christmas Angels: 3 Heavenly Romances 1996
 Mothers & Daughters, Signet 1998
 ’Tis the Season, "Christmas Masquerade" @ Silhouette 1999
 Ready for Love, "Ready for Marriage", "Ready for Romance"♦ MIRA Books 2001
 Take 5, "Yesterday Once More", "Adam's Image" ♦ Harlequin 2001
 An Ideal Marriage?, "Father’s Day", "First Comes Marriage", "Here Comes Trouble" ♦ Harlequin 2001
 Silhouette Christmas Collection, Midnight Clear, "Let It Snow" Silhouette 2001
 Darling Daughters, "Yours and Mine", "Lone Star Lovin'" Harlequin Books 2002
 Christmas Anthology, "A Gift To Last", "Can This Be Christmas?", "Shirley, Goodness & Mercy" ♦ MIRA Books 2002
 On A Snowy Night, "The Snow Bride" & "The Christmas Basket" MIRA Books November 2004
 Home for the Holidays–More Than Words–Volume 2, "What Amanda Wants" Harlequin Books October 2005
 Home for the Holidays, "When Christmas Comes" & "The Forgetful Bride" MIRA Books November 2005
 Someday Soon & Sooner or Later, Avon Books June 2006
 Glad Tidings, "There’s Something About Christmas" & "Here Comes Trouble" MIRA Books November 2006
 Ready for Love, "Ready for Romance" & "Ready for Marriage" MIRA Books December 2006
 Be My Valentine, "My Funny Valentine", "My Hero" MIRA Books January 2007
 Small Town Christmas, "Return to Promise" & "Mail-Order Bride" MIRA Books 2008

Anthologies in collaboration
 My Valentine Harlequin, 1992 (with Katherine Arthur, Leigh Michaels and Peggy Nicholson)
 To Have and To Hold, Harlequin 1992 (with Barbara Bretton, Rita Clay Estrada, Sandra James)
 Christmas Treasures '92, Silhouette 1992 (with Maura Seger)
 Purrfect Love, Harper 1994 (with Linda Lael Miller and Patricia Simpson)
 Little Matchmakers, "The Matchmakers" Harlequin 1994/1996 (with Barbara Bretton, Muriel Jensen)
 Always and Forever (1995) (with Bethany Campbell, Jasmine Cresswell)
 Three Mothers and a Cradle: Rock-a-bye Baby, Cradle Song, Beginnings (1996) (with Jill Marie Landis and Gina Wilkins)
 Runaway Brides, "Yesterday Once More" Silhouette 1996 (with Annette Broadrick and Paula Detmer Riggs)
 Home for Christmas, "The Forgetful Bride" Harlequin 1996 (with Anne McAllister and Shannon Waverly)
 Christmas Kisses, Silhouette 1996 (with Linda Howard and Linda Turner)
 The Father Factor (1998) (with Ann Major and Diana Palmer)
 That Summer Place, MIRA Books 1998 (with Jill Barnett and Susan Wiggs)
 Through the Years, "Baby Blessed" ♦ Silhouette 1999 (with Linda Howard and Fern Michaels)
 Power of Love (1999) (with Jayne Ann Krentz and Diana Palmer)
 A Spring Bouquet, "The Marrying Kind" ♦ Zebra 1996/2000 (with Jo Beverley, Rebecca Brandewyne, Janet Dailey)
 Born in a Small Town, "Midnight Sons & Daughters" Harlequin 2000 (with Judith Bowen, Janice Kay Johnson)
 Holiday Blessings, "Thanksgiving Prayer" ♦ Steeple Hill 2000 Harlequin 2000 (with Irene Hannon and Jane Peart)
 Sealed With a Kiss, "My Funny Valentine" ♦ Harlequin 2002 (with Judith Bowen, Helen Brooks)
 Their New Year Babies (2004) (with Marie Ferrarella)
 Kiss Me Again (2005) (with Suzanne Forster, Lori Foster, Lisa Jackson)
 Hearts Divided, "5-B Poppy Place" MIRA Books February 2006 (with Lois Faye Dyer and Katherine Stone)
 Soldiers Brides (2007) (with Lois Faye Dyer and Lyn Stone)

Nonfiction
 Knit Along with Debbie Macomber (2005)
 Knit Together (2007)
 Debbie Macomber's Cedar Cove Cookbook (2009)
 One Simple Act: Discovering the Power of Generosity (2009)
 God's Guest List: Welcoming Those Who Influence our Lives (2010)
 Debbie Macomber's Christmas Cookbook (2011)
 One Perfect Word (2012)
 Patterns of Grace: Devotions from the Heart (2012)
 Once Upon a Time: Discovering Our Forever After Story (2013)
 Debbie Macomber's Table: Sharing the Joy of Cooking with Family and Friends (April 3, 2018)

Awards
 The Christmas Basket'': 2003 RITA Award Best Novel winner

Bibliographies of American writers
Bibliographies by writer
Romantic fiction bibliographies